Wierzbówka may refer to:

Wierzbówka, Lublin Voivodeship (east Poland)
Wierzbówka, Łódź Voivodeship (central Poland)

See also
Wierzbowa (disambiguation)